Ben Slimane Airport  is an airport serving Ben Slimane, a town in the Casablanca-Settat region in Morocco.  It may have been built as a U.S. Strategic Air Command airbase.

Facilities

References

External links
 3973d Combat Defense Squadron's Webpage for the SAC's 16th Air Force Units and Bases,   Boulhart AB, Morocco
 Public Papers of the Presidents of the United States, Dwight D. Eisenhower, 1959: Containing the Public Messages, Speeches, and Statements of the President, January 1 to December 31, 1959. At a meeting in Casablanca, Eisenhower and the King of Morocco agreed that immediate steps were to be taken to release the airfield at Ben Slimane. This was to be accomplished no later than March 31, 1960.
 Google Maps - Ben Slimane
 
 

Airports in Morocco
Buildings and structures in Casablanca-Settat